Chenault is a surname. Notable people with the surname include:

 Chelsea Chenault (born 1994), competitive swimmer
 Cynthia Chenault (born 1937), actress (screen name Cindy Robbins) and television writer
 Gene Chenault (1919–2010), co-founder of Drake-Chenault radio syndication company
 Kenneth Chenault (born 1951), chairman of American Express
 Lawrence Chenault (1877–1943), silent film actor
 Léon Chenault (1853–1930), botanist
 Marcus Wayne Chenault (1951–1995), convicted killer of Alberta King
 Mike Chenault (born 1957), Speaker of the Alaska House of Representatives
 Renee Chenault-Fattah (born 1957), television news anchor

See also
Chennault (disambiguation)